CBS Springfield could refer to:
 WSHM-LD (Springfield, Massachusetts)
 WCIA (Springfield, Illinois)
 KOLR (Springfield, Missouri)